Sullivan Township, Illinois may refer to one of the following townships:

 Sullivan Township, Livingston County, Illinois
 Sullivan Township, Moultrie County, Illinois

See also

Sullivan Township (disambiguation)

Illinois township disambiguation pages